Ratkovac, 'Ratkoc' or 'Ratkoci', is a small village in Kosovo. The name Ratkovac means Place of a warrior in serbian, derived from the Serbian word rat, which means war.

99% of inhabitants of this village are ethnic Albanian and 1% are declared as minority, but speak Albanian as their only language.

Notes and references
Notes:

References:

External links
 Drinas.eu

Villages in Orahovac